The Acheron ( or ;  Acheron or Ἀχερούσιος Acherousios;  Acherontas) is a river located in the Epirus region of northwest Greece. Its source is near the village Zotiko, in the southwestern part of the Ioannina regional unit, and it flows into the Ionian Sea in Ammoudia, near Parga. 

The Acheron also features prominently in Greek mythology, where it is often depicted as the entrance to the Greek Underworld where souls must be ferried across by Charon (although some later sources, such as Roman poets, assign this role to the river Styx).

Mythology
Ancient Greek mythology saw the Acheron, sometimes known as the "river of woe", as one of the five rivers of the Greek underworld.
The name is of uncertain etymology.

Most classical accounts, including Pausanias (10.28) and later Dante's Inferno (3.78), portray the Acheron as the entrance to the Underworld and depict Charon ferrying the souls of the dead across it. Ancient Greek literary sources – such as Pindar, Aeschylus, Euripides, Plato, and Callimachus – also place Charon on the Acheron. Roman poets, including Propertius, Ovid, and Statius, name the river as the Styx, perhaps following the geography of Virgil's underworld in the Aeneid, where Charon is associated with both rivers. 

The Homeric poems describe the Acheron as a river of Hades, into which Cocytus and Phlegethon both flowed.

The Roman poet Virgil called the Acheron the principal river of Tartarus, from which the Styx and the Cocytus both sprang.  The newly dead would be ferried across the Acheron by Charon in order to enter the Underworld.  

The Suda describes the river as "a place of healing, not a place of punishment, cleansing and purging the sins of humans".

According to later traditions, Acheron had been a son of Helios and either Gaia or Demeter, who was turned into the Underworld river bearing his name after he refreshed the Titans with drink during their contest with Zeus. By this myth, Acheron is also the father of Ascalaphus by either Orphne or Gorgyra.

The river called Acheron with the nearby ruins of the Necromanteion (oratory of the dead) is found near Parga on the mainland of Greece opposite Corfu. Another branch of Acheron was believed to surface at the Acherusian cape (now Karadeniz Ereğli in Turkey) and was seen by the Argonauts according to Apollonius of Rhodes. Greeks who settled in Italy identified the Acherusian lake into which Acheron flowed with Lake Avernus. Plato in his Phaedo identified Acheron as the second greatest river in the world, excelled only by Oceanus.

He claimed that Acheron flowed in the opposite direction from Oceanus beneath the earth under desert places.
The word is also occasionally used as a synecdoche for Hades itself. Virgil mentions Acheron with the other infernal rivers in his description of the underworld in Book VI of the Aeneid. In Book VII, line 312 he gives to Juno the famous saying, flectere si nequeo superos, Acheronta movebo: 'If I cannot bend the will of Heaven, I shall move Hell.' The same words were used by Sigmund Freud as the dedicatory motto for his seminal book The Interpretation of Dreams, figuring Acheron as psychological underworld beneath the conscious mind.

The Acheron was sometimes referred to as a lake or swamp in Greek literature, as in Aristophanes' The Frogs and Euripides' Alcestis.

In Dante's Inferno, the Acheron river forms the border of Hell. Following Greek mythology, Charon ferries souls across this river to Hell. Those who were neutral in life sit on the banks.

In culture 
In Christopher Marlowe's play, The Tragical History of Doctor Faustus, Acheron is mentioned in Act I, scene iii, wherein Doctor Faustus conjures Mephistophiles: Sint mihi dei Acherontis propitii, or "May the gods of Hell (Acheron) be propitious unto me."

In Shakespeare's play, Macbeth, Acheron is referenced as a euphemism for the gates of hell by Hecate in Act III, scene v: "Get you gone, and at the pit of Acheron meet me i' th' morning."

Modern references in popular culture 
The name Acheron was used as a reference within the Alien film franchise for the planet LV426 (where the crashed alien vessel containing the face-huggers was originally found). Known solely by its alphanumeric designation during the first film, the planet was named as Acheron during the sequel Aliens (1986).

Robert E. Howard used Acheron as the name of an ancient kingdom, ruled by evil sorcerers a few thousand years before The Hyborian Age. In The Hour of the Dragon, the only novel-length Conan the Barbarian story by Howard, the wizard Xaltotun, formerly of Acheron, is resurrected by necromancy and is Conan's main antagonist. It was used again, in the same sense, by the movie Conan the Barbarian.

Acheron was the French privateer ship that Captain Jack Aubrey pursued in the epic period war-drama film Master and Commander: The Far Side of the World (2003).

The name Acheron is used for the Lawful (Neutral) Evil Outer Plane in Dungeons & Dragons, however it is described as consisting of a huge number of iron cubes of varying size, instead of a river.

The River Acheron makes multiple appearances in the Percy Jackson & the Olympians series.

There are multiple references to Acheron in the lore of the Destiny video games, including a weapon called the "Acheron SR5".

Acherus The Ebon Hold is an undead floating necropolis in World of Warcraft and is the starting area for all death knights. It is the headquarters of the Knights of the Ebon Blade formerly known as Death Knights of Acherus in service of the Lich King.

This river was also the site of the battle between Acheron Charon and Pegasus Seiya and Andromeda Shun, when the Bronze Saints descended into the Underworld during the Hades arc in Saint Seiya

It is also the episode title of the two-part season eleven premiere of the AMC post-apocalyptic horror television series The Walking Dead.

Acheron is used as the name of the setting of the Warp Riders album by The Sword

Namesake
Acheron Lake in Antarctica is named after the mythical river.

Several ships have been named HMS Acheron.

There is a stream named the Dry Acheron in Canterbury, New Zealand.

Gallery

References

External links

 L'Achéron, Viol Consort 

Potamoi
Rivers of Greece
Rivers of Hades
Geography of ancient Epirus
Epirotic mythology
Landforms of Ioannina (regional unit)
Rivers of Epirus (region)
Children of Demeter
Landforms of Preveza (regional unit)
Drainage basins of the Ionian Sea
Metamorphoses into bodies of water in Greek mythology
Children of Gaia
Children of Helios